CCGS C.P. Edwards was a Canadian Coast Guard ship. Entering into service as a coastal freighter in 1946 with the name Ottawa Mayhill, it was commissioned in 1947 as CGS C.P. Edwards for the Department of Transport's Marine Service, serving as a light vessel. C.P. Edwards was transferred into the newly created Canadian Coast Guard in 1962, and was decommissioned in 1972. The vessel was sold to private interests that year. An engine was acquired by Canadian Science and Technology Museum in 1976. The Canadian registry of the vessel was closed in 1979 and the ship was sold to U.S. interests.

Description
The ship was powered by a triple expansion steam engine driving one screw, creating . In

Service history
The ship was ordered from Collingwood Shipbuilding as part of wartime construction and was built at their yard in Collingwood, Ontario. The vessel was laid down as Ottawa Mayhill and launched on 26 October 1946. The vessel was taken over during construction and was completed as a buoy tender in March 1947.

Named for the former Deputy Minister of the Department of Transport (1941–1948) and later Deputy Minister of Air Transport, Charles Peter Edwards, the ship was stationed at Parry Sound, Ontario until 1972 when the vessel was taken out of service. The ship was put up for sale and sold to Peter LePage Ltd in 1972, keeping the same name. In 1974, the ship was sold to E. Nieminen. Acquired by Kilbear Construction Company Limited in 1975 and sold later to Marine Transport & Engineering Ltd. in 1976. Its engine was acquired by the Canada Science and Technology Museum in 1976. The vessel's Canadian registry was closed on 19 September 1979 and it was sold to U.S. interests.

Notes

Citations

Sources
 
 
 

Navaids tenders of the Canadian Coast Guard
1946 ships
Service vessels of Canada
Canadian Government Ship
Ships built in Collingwood, Ontario